Jonathan Palma (born 8 December 1981) is a retired Venezuelan sprinter who specialised in the 400 metres. He won multiple medals on the regional level.

His personal best of 45.55, set in Ambato in 2001, is the current national record.

Competition record

References

1981 births
Living people
Athletes (track and field) at the 2003 Pan American Games
Venezuelan male sprinters
Pan American Games competitors for Venezuela
Central American and Caribbean Games bronze medalists for Venezuela
Competitors at the 2002 Central American and Caribbean Games
Central American and Caribbean Games medalists in athletics
20th-century Venezuelan people
21st-century Venezuelan people